Abdul Latif is a Muslim male given name and, in modern usage, surname. It is built from the Arabic words ʻabd and al-Laṭīf, one of the names of God in the Qur'an, which gave rise to the Muslim theophoric names. It means "servant of the All-gentle".

The letter ''a'' of the ''al-'' is unstressed, and can be transliterated by almost any vowel, often by ''e''. So the first part can appear as Abdel, Abdul or Abd-al. The second part may appear as Latif, Lateef or in other ways. The whole name is subject to variable spacing and hyphenation.

The surname is used by Muslims and also by Orthodox Christians in Syria and Lebanon.

It may refer to:

People

Given name 
Abd al-Latif al-Baghdadi (medieval writer) (1162–1231), Iraqi physician, historian, Egyptologist and traveller
Abd al-Latif ibn Muhammad Taraghay Ulughbek (ca. 1420–1450), Timurid ruler of Transoxiana
Ghabdellatif of Kazan (born ca. 1475), khan of Kazan Khanate, 1496–1502
Shah Abdul Latif Kazmi, known as Bari Imam (1617–1705), Indian Sufi
Shah Abdul Latif Bhittai (1689–1752), Sindhi Sufi scholar, mystic, saint, poet, and musician
Nawab Abdul Latif (1828–1893), Bengali educator and social worker
Sahibzada Abdul Latif (1853–1903), Afghan executed for heresy
Abdullah Abdul Latif Al Othman (1895–1965), Kuwaiti businessman
Abdul Latif Tibawi (1910–1981), Palestinian historian
Abdul Latif Chowdhury, known as Saheb Qibla Fultali (1913–2008), Bangladeshi Islamic scholar
Abdel Latif Boghdadi (politician) (1917–1999), Egyptian politician, air force officer, and judge
Abdul Latif (musician) (1927–2005), Bangladeshi musician
Abdellatif Filali (1928–2009), Moroccan politician and diplomat
Abdul Latif Dayfallah (born 1930), Yemeni politician
Abdel Latif El Zein (born 1932), Lebanese politician
Abdul Latif Galadari (born 1939), Emirati Businessman
Abdul Latif Hakimi, Afghan, Taliban spokesman
Abdul Latif (cricketer) (born 1939), Pakistani cricketer, Bangladeshi cricket administrator
Abdul Latief (Indonesian businessman) (born 1940), businessman and politician
Abdellatif Laabi (born 1942), Moroccan poet
Abdul Latif Afridi (born 1943), Pakistani lawyer
Abdul Latif Siddiqui (born 1943), Bangladeshi politician
Abdul Latif Rashid (born 1944), Iraqi politician
Abdul Latif Sharif (1947–2006), Egyptian-American convicted of rape and murder
Abdul-Latif Ali al-Mayah (ca. 1949–2004), Iraqi academic and politician
Ǧamīl ʿAbdu 'l-Laṭīf al-Bannāʾ, or just Jamil al-Banna (born 1952), Jordanian arrested in Gambia, now a refugee in Britain
Jamaal Abdul-Lateef (born 1953), American basketball player better known as Jamaal Wilkes
Abdul Latif (restaurateur) (1954–2008), Bangladeshi-British curry house owner
Abdellatif Abdelhamid (born 1954), Syrian film director
Abdüllatif Şener (born 1954), Turkish politician
Abdullatif bin Rashid Al Zayani (born 1955), fifth Gulf Cooperation Council (GCC) Secretary General 
Abdou Latif Guèye (1956–2008), Senegalese politician
Abdellatif Kechiche (born 1960), Tunisian actor and film director
Abdul Latif Pedram (born 1963), Afghan politician
Abdul Latif Nasir (born 1965), Moroccan held in Guantanamo
Abdulatif Al-Ameeri (born 1966), Kuwaiti politician
Yahya Abd-al-Latif Ayyash, known as Yahya Ayyash (1966-1996), Palestinian Hamas fighter
Abdelatif Benazzi (born 1968), Moroccan-French Rugby footballer
Abdellatif Jrindou (born 1974), Moroccan footballer
Walid Salah Abdel Latif (born 1977), Egyptian footballer
Abdelatif Chemlal (born 1982), Moroccan runner
Abdellatif Meftah (born 1982), Moroccan-French runner
Abdellatif Boutaty (born 1983), Moroccan Rugby footballer
Abdel Latif Ahmed (born 1983), Egyptian volleyball player
Abdelatif Bahdari (born 1984), Palestinian footballer
Abdulatif Al-Ghanam (born 1985), Saudi footballer
Ismaeel Abdullatif (born 1986), Bahraini footballer
Abdul-Latif Salifu (born 1990), Ghanaian footballer
Faysal Abd al-Latif al-Shaabi, or just Faysal al-Shaabi (died 1971), South Yemen politician
Abdul Lateef (Fijian lawyer) (died 2008), lawyer and politician
Abdel Latif Moussa (died 2009), Palestinian religious and political activist
Abdul Latif Ahmadi, Afghan film director
Ahmed Abd Ellatif
Wael Abdul Latif, Iraqi politician
M.Abdul Lathief, Indian politician in Tamil Nadu
Abdul Latiff Ahmad, Malaysian politician
Abdul Latif Ibrahimi, Afghan politician
Abdul Latif (criminal), Indian underworld figure

Other 
Jumah Mohammed Abdul Latif Al Dossari, or just Juma al-Dossary, Bahraini held in Guantanamo
Leila Abdul-Latif, Iraqi politician
Mohd Zakry Abdul Latif, Malaysian badminton player
Osama Abdul Latif, Sudanese businessman
Siti Fauziah Sheikh Abdul Latiff, or just Fauziah Latiff (born 1970), Malaysian singer and actress

References

Arabic masculine given names
Turkish masculine given names